Bantay Abot Cave is a natural rock formation and tourist attraction along the shores of Balaoi, Pagudpud, Ilocos Norte.

Despite being called a cave, Bantay Abot means "mountain with a hole". This cave-like rock archway that frames a rocky shore is believed to have been a hill that eroded over time after an earthquake struck.

It faces the West Philippine Sea, and is a few kilometers away from Kabigan Falls and Patapat Viaduct.

References 

Caves of the Philippines
Geography of Ilocos Norte